Panzer-Division Holstein was an armoured division of the German army during World War 2. It was in formed February 1945 through the acquisition of the mobile parts of the 233 Reserve Panzer Division. It suffered heavy losses in Kolberg, Military District II, and the remnants were absorbed by the 18. Volksgrenadier division in March 1945.

Known commanders
Generalleutnant Max Fremerey (1 Feb 1945 – 16 Feb 1945)
Oberst Ernst Wellmann (16 Feb 1945 – 30 Mar 1945)

Area of operation
Berlin, Germany, and Denmark

Organisation of the division
 Pz.Abt.44
 Pz.Gren.Rgt. 139
 Pz.Gren.Rgt. 142
 Pz.Aufkl.Abt. 44
 Pz.Jg.Abt. 144
 Pz.Art.Abt. 144
 Pz.Pi.Btl. 144
 Pz.Nachr.Kp. 144
 Kdr.Pz.Nachschubtruppen 144

References

German panzer divisions
Military units and formations established in 1945
Military units and formations disestablished in 1945